Oropesa may refer to:
 Oropesa (minesweeping), a naval minesweeping device
 SS Oropesa, a British steam turbine ocean liner launched in 1919
 Oropesa, Spain, a town in Toledo, Spain
 Oropesa, Antabamba, the capital of Oropesa District, Antabamba, Peru
 Oropesa, Quispicanchi, the capital of Oropesa District, Quispicanchi, Peru
 Oropesa del Mar, a municipality in the comarca of Plana Alta in the Valencian Community, Spain

People with the surname
 Eddie Oropesa (born 1971), Cuban baseball pitcher
 Elizabeth Oropesa (born 1954), Filipina actress
 Lisette Oropesa (born 1983), American soprano

See also
 Oropesa del Mar, a municipality in Castellón, Spain
 Oropesa District (disambiguation)